The Souris River or Mouse River (as it is alternatively known in the U.S., a calque of its French name) is a river in central North America.

Rising in southern Saskatchewan in the Yellow Grass Marshes north of Weyburn, the river wanders southeast into the U.S. through North Dakota beyond Minot to its most southern point at Velva, and then back north into Canada in southwestern Manitoba.

The main tributaries of the Souris in Manitoba are the Antler River, Gainsborough Creek, and Plum Creek.

At the end of the last ice age, over 10,000 years ago, the rapid draining of former Glacial Lake Regina eroded a large channel that is now occupied by the much smaller contemporary Souris River. Also, much of the drainage basin is fertile silt and clay deposited by another former glacial lake, Lake Souris.

Flow rates and flood potential 
During the period from 1930 to 1941 severe drought conditions prevailed and PFRA constructed four stock watering dams. In 1937 the Snyder and Ross Dams were built near Melita. In 1938 the Napinka Dam was built and the Hartney Dam was built in 1941. The Souris Dam was originally built in 1911 and was rebuilt in 1935.

Most of the annual flow of the Souris River comes from snow melt and spring rains. It is expected that the total runoff for 2011 at Wawanesa will exceed  about a one in 500-year event. The average annual runoff is equivalent to 3 mm over the entire Souris River watershed.

Two large dams in Saskatchewan, Rafferty Dam and Grant Devine Dam were built, in part, to reduce flood peaks on the Souris River.

In summer 2011, a historic flood affected much of the Souris River basin, overtopping levees and causing the evacuation of about 11,000 residents in Minot as well as significant damage to farmland and other property along the length of the river.

The channel capacity of the river in Manitoba varies from about  near the border, to about  through Melita, to about  near Lauder and  near Hartney.

Tributaries 

Long Creek
Short Creek
Moose Mountain Creek
Des Lacs River
Livingston Creek
Wintering River
Deep River
Little Deep Creek
Spring Coulee
Cut Bank Creek (North Dakota)
North Lake 
Egg Creek
Hay Coulee
Buffalo Lodge Lake
South Egg Creek
Willow Creek
Snake Creek (North Dakota)
Oak Creek
Ox Creek
Wolf Creek
Plum Creek (Manitoba), a river that drains Plum Lakes and Oak Lake (Manitoba) into the Souris River
Stony Creek, flows into Maple Lake, which drains into Plum Lakes
Pipestone Creek (Saskatchewan), flows into Oak Lake
Little Pipestone Creek
Montgomery Creek
Jackson Creek
Graham Creek
Boundary Creek (North Dakota)
Antler River
Gainsborough Creek

Cities along the river 

Weyburn, Saskatchewan
Estevan, Saskatchewan
Roche Percee, Saskatchewan
Oxbow, Saskatchewan
Burlington, North Dakota
Minot, North Dakota
Velva, North Dakota
Towner, North Dakota
Westhope, North Dakota
Melita, Manitoba
Souris, Manitoba
Wawanesa, Manitoba

Rural Municipalities along the river 
Souris Valley No. 7, Saskatchewan
Municipality of Grassland
Municipality of Oakland-Wawanesa

Bridges across the river 
Eastwood Park Bridge: NRHP-listed crossing in Minot, North Dakota
Elliott Bridge: NRHP-listed crossing in McHenry County, North Dakota
Westgaard Bridge: NRHP listed crossing in McHenry County, North Dakota

Fish species 
Fish species include walleye, yellow perch, northern pike, white sucker, black bullhead, goldeye, brown bullhead, smallmouth bass, and burbot.

See also 
List of rivers of Manitoba
List of rivers of North Dakota
List of rivers of Saskatchewan

References

External links 

 USGS Canoeing Information
 International Joint Commission page on the Souris River
 Rafferty and Alameda Dams
 West Souris River Conservation District
 Fish Species of Saskatchewan
 Encyclopedia of Saskatchewan

Rivers of Manitoba
Rivers of North Dakota
Rivers of Saskatchewan
International rivers of North America
Bodies of water of Ward County, North Dakota
Bodies of water of McHenry County, North Dakota
Bodies of water of Bottineau County, North Dakota
Tributaries of the Assiniboine River
Tributaries of Hudson Bay